Ludwig Schaschek (9 August 1888 – 28 January 1948) was an Austrian cinematographer.

Selected filmography
 Flora Mystica (1922)
 Tales of Old Vienna (1923)
 The Hell of Barballo (1923)
 Die heiratsfähige Puppe (1925)
 A Waltz by Strauss (1925)
 Die Königin von Moulin Rouge (1926)
 Der Rosenkavalier (1926)
 The Right to Live (1927)
 Das weisse Paradies (1929)

Bibliography
 Jung, Uli & Schatzberg, Walter. Beyond Caligari: The Films of Robert Wiene. Berghahn Books, 1999.

External links

1888 births
1948 deaths
Austrian cinematographers
Film people from Vienna